The Spokane River Bridge at Long Lake Dam, at Long Lake Dam near Reardan, Washington, is a historic  concrete bridge that was built in 1949. It was a work of the State Department of Highways and of Henry Hagman. Its center span is a  open-spandrel arch. The bridge was listed on the National Register of Historic Places in 1995.

It brings State Route 231 across the Spokane River, connecting Lincoln County and Stevens County.

See also
List of bridges documented by the Historic American Engineering Record in Washington (state)
List of crossings of the Spokane River

References

External links

Bridges completed in 1949
Road bridges on the National Register of Historic Places in Washington (state)
Transportation buildings and structures in Lincoln County, Washington
Transportation buildings and structures in Stevens County, Washington
Historic American Engineering Record in Washington (state)
National Register of Historic Places in Lincoln County, Washington
National Register of Historic Places in Stevens County, Washington
Concrete bridges in the United States
Open-spandrel deck arch bridges in the United States